Bernhard Moritz Carl Ludwig Riedel (18 September 1846 – 12 September 1916) was a German surgeon who was a native of Teschentin, Grossherzogtum Mecklenburg.

Biography
He graduated from the University of Rostock in 1872, and for the next three years was prosector at Rostock under Friedrich Sigmund Merkel (1845-1919). In 1875, he became an in 1877. In the ensuing years, he studied surgery with Bernhard von Langenbeck (1810-1887) and Heinrich Adolf von Bardeleben (1819-1895), later being appointed chief physician of the surgical department at the Städtisches Krankenhaus in Aachen (1881). In 1888 he became director of the surgical clinic at the University of Jena.

Riedel was a pioneer in the surgical treatment of appendicitis and cholecystitis. In 1888 he performed the first choledochoduodenostomy (anastomosis of the common bile duct to the duodenum). His name is lent to the following medical eponyms:
 Riedel thyroiditis: (sometimes called ligneous thyroiditis, invasive fibrous thyroiditis or struma fibromatosis): An uncommon thyroid disease in which the thyroid gland is replaced by extensive fibrosis. First described by Riedel in 1896.
 Riedel's lobe: A tongue-shaped process of the liver, often found protruding over the gallbladder in cases of chronic cholecystitis.

References

External links
 Bernhard Riedel @ Who Named It
 NCBI National Library of Medicine; Riedel and cholecystitis

1846 births
1916 deaths
German surgeons
Academic staff of the University of Jena